Franz Lichtblau (23 February 1928 – 25 November 2019) was a German architect.

Lichtblau studied after his Abitur 1946 and after an apprenticeship as a carpenter with Egon Eiermann at the Technical University of Karlsruhe as well as with Robert Vorhoelzer, Martin Elsaesser, Hermann Leitenstorfer and Hans Döllgast at the Technical University of Munich.
In 1956 he took part in a competition for the Protestant Church in Oberaudorf am Inn, which he won. Subsequently, he established a number of Protestant churches in Upper Bavaria and from 1962 also in Würzburg, Coburg, Erlangen, Augsburg, Bamberg and Kempten. In addition, he undertook numerous monumental renovations in Nördlingen, Memmingen, Lindau, Schweinfurt and Amberg. In partnership with Ludwig J. N. Bauer (1929–2003), social buildings, kindergartens, student residences, facilities for the disabled, old people's and nursing homes, residential buildings, city extensions as well as industrial and commercial buildings were also built.
Lichtblau often worked together with the church painter Hubert Distler.
In addition to Olaf Andreas Gulbransson, Gustav Gsaenger and Reinhard Riemerschmid, who died at an early age, Lichtblau had a decisive influence on Protestant church architecture in Bavaria in the second half of the 20th century. Many of the churches that Lichtblau created are built over a polygonal ground plan. Most of them have a freestanding tower.

Buildings (selection) 

 Church of the Resurrection in Gartenstadt Keesburg, Würzburg
 Conversion of the Max barracks into 50 social housing units (Lindau Island, 1989)
 Emmauskirche in Munich (1964)
 Extension of the church of the Resurrection by Olaf Andreas Gulbransson in Neufahrn (Landkreis Freising) by Community hall and parsonage (1972, with Ludwig Bauer)
 Extension of the reconciliation church in Neunburg vorm Wald (1966–1968)
 Immanuelkirche in Munich (1965–1966)
 Johanneskirche in Alterlangen (1963–1964)
 Michaelskapelle in Dietramszell (1961)
 New choir centre for the Windsbacher Knabenchor (1974 by competition)
 Pfennigparade in Munich-Schwabing (Bauabschnitt 3: Behinderten- und Personalwohnungen, Gewerbetrakt, 1976)
 Philippuskirche in Munich (1964)
 Protestant church in Übersee (on heptagonal ground plan, 1965)
 Protestant church of the Resurrection in Oberaudorf (1957–1958), since 1999 under monument protection
 Reconstruction and extension of social homes of the Rummelsberger Diakonie (Schloss Ditterswind etc.)
 St.-Andreas Church in Augsburg (1966–1967)
 Redesign of the Johanneskirche in Bad Tölz (1970)
 Zachäuskirche in Sauerlach (1963)

Literature 
 Andreas Hildmann (Hrsg.): Kleine Kirchen von Franz Lichtblau. Eine Werkliste. Kunstverlag Josef Fink, Lindenberg 2013, .

External links

 
 

1928 births
2019 deaths
20th-century German architects
Bavarian architects
People from Bad Tölz
Technical University of Munich alumni